Euchomenella macrops is a species of mantis in the family Deroplatyidae. It is found on the islands of Sumatra and Java in Indonesia.

References 

Deroplatyinae
Insects of Indonesia
Insects described in 1922